Springfield railway station serves the village of Springfield in Fife, Scotland. The station has two platforms and is unstaffed. Services are operated by ScotRail.

History 
The station was opened in 1847 by the Edinburgh and Northern Railway and was likely designed by David Bell, an architect who worked on the railway and is credited with the design of other stations in the area.

To the west of the station, the Cults and Pitlessie Lime Works industrial spur line met the mainline at Cults siding, allowing access to the Cults and Pitlessie Lime Works and Pitlessie Maltings to the south. In 1947 this line was closed. Remnants of the railway, including a number of bridges, can be found on the Crawford Priory Estate.

Services 
Only a few trains are scheduled to stop at Springfield station. On Mondays to Saturdays - in the May 2021 timetable, 3 northbound and 2 southbound trains call. 

There is no Sunday service.

Routes

References

Sources

External links 

 Train Times and Station Information for Springfield railway station from Network Rail.  
 Springfield railway station on RAILSCOT. 
 Springfield railway station (100780) on Canmore.

Railway stations in Fife
Railway stations served by ScotRail
Railway stations in Great Britain opened in 1847
Former North British Railway stations
1847 establishments in Scotland